Tansen  United Mission Hospital (तानसेन मिशन अस्पताल) is located in the Palpa district of Nepal.  The hospital serves thousands of patients from western Nepal and northern India, and is part of a broader healthcare network. The hospital is part of United Mission to Nepal. The hospital was started on 15 June 1954. Besides providing basic health services, it is involved in community health education. It is one of few hospitals in Nepal with its own pharmacy।

History

Tansen Mission Hospital was started by United Mission to Nepal in 1959 by a group of Christian doctors. It was mainly conceived during the visit of Dr Robert Flemming (ornithologist), his wife Dr Bethel Flemming,  and Dr Carl Friedericks in the winter of 1951 –1952. The first hospital building was constructed in 1959.

Notable Doctors
 Dr. Carl Friedericks
 Dr. Robert Flemming 
 Dr. Bethel Flemming (wife of Dr. Robert Flemming)

Current
The hospital has 165 beds looked after by about 315 local staffs. There are few mission appointees (depends on volunteer numbers) from the UK, USA, Australia, Sweden and other countries.

Facilities
Currently, this hospital operates following departments:
Dental
Orthopaedics
Paediatrics
Pastoral Care
Surgery: Surgical facilities include daily outpatient surgical clinics, two minor operation theatres and two operating theatres. Generally, these are run as one orthopaedic and one general surgical theatre.
X-Ray and CT
Community Health Care
 Hostel
 Doctor's accommodation

Training
The hospital trains nurses, doctors, and paramedics. About ten interns (both local and international) is trained every year.

In addition, the training is provided to the students of Tansen Nursing School.

Research and development
Besides treatment, the hospital is actively involved in research works. Various medical papers are published regularly by its staff or volunteers such as `survival of new born baby  and introduction of new technology for rural hospitals 

In 2017, device called Tansen videolaryngoscope was developed in this hospital.

Treated patients
In 2010, the hospital treated 83,218 and admitted 11,201. Total number of deliveries was 2,116 and total surgical procedures was 7,624. Total numbers of antenatal visits in the town clinic this year was 3,823 (3,576) and under five attendance was 3,680. There were about 1000 patients each month in the emergency department.

Recognition
The hospital has received the following awards:
Dixa Daxa Sewa Puraskar in 2001 and 2014 by the National TB Centre
Swasthiya Kadar Patra in 2012
Best Hospital Award in 2012
Healthcare Leadership Award in 2012 from KRDW

External links
Official website
UMN projects in Nepal

References

Hospitals in Nepal
1959 establishments in Nepal